Two Sentence Horror Stories is an American anthology horror television series. It was acquired by The CW for an airing in the U.S. in mid-2019 and premiered on August 8, 2019, after being originally set up at CW Seed. On May 14, 2020, The CW renewed the series for a second season, which premiered on January 12, 2021. On September 17, 2020, the series was renewed for a third season, which premiered on January 16, 2022.

Premise
The first season consists of nine 20-minute episodes, each of which has a self-contained plot and characters. The series began as a series of five short films before The CW adapted it as a regular series.

Episodes

Season 1 (2019)

Season 2 (2021)

Season 3 (2022)

References

External links
 
 

English-language television shows
The CW original programming
2019 American television series debuts
2010s American anthology television series
2010s American horror television series
2020s American anthology television series
2020s American horror television series
American horror fiction television series
2010s American LGBT-related television series
2020s American LGBT-related television series
Television series by Warner Bros. Television Studios